The 1964 United States presidential election in Washington took place on November 3, 1964, as part of the 1964 United States presidential election. State voters chose nine representatives, or electors, to the Electoral College, who voted for president and vice president.

Washington was won by incumbent President Lyndon B. Johnson (D–Texas), with 61.97% of the popular vote, against Senator Barry Goldwater (R–Arizona), with 37.37% of the popular vote. , this is the last election in which Yakima County, Benton County, Grant County, Franklin County, Lewis County, Chelan County, Walla Walla County, Stevens County, Douglas County, Columbia County, and Garfield County voted for a Democratic presidential candidate.

Results

Results by county

See also
 United States presidential elections in Washington (state)

References

Washington
1964
1964 Washington (state) elections